Santa Giustina is a comune (municipality) in the province of Belluno in the Italian region of Veneto, located about  northwest of Venice and about  southwest of Belluno.

Santa Giustina borders the following municipalities: Cesiomaggiore, Lentiai, Mel, San Gregorio nelle Alpi, Sedico, Sospirolo.
Mount Pizzocco is located nearby.

International relations

Twin towns / Sister cities 
  São Valentim, Brazil

References

External links 
 Official website

Cities and towns in Veneto